The Tapes is a 2011 horror film directed by Lee Alliston and Scott Bates and starring Jason Maza, Mark Dusty Miller, and Lee Alliston. Made in the "found footage" filmmaking style, it concerns three students who run afoul of devil worshipers.

Premise
The film concerns Danny and his girlfriend plus friends who find out about a local swingers party in the area but instead find a cult that worships Satan.

Cast
Jason Maza as Danny
Mark Dusty Miller as Worshipper
Lee Alliston as Farmer
Mandy Lee Berger as The Barmaid
Eddie Focarelli as Horse
Eddie Folcarelli as Worshipper
Jodie Mooney as Whistable Kid
Nick Nevern as Danny's brother
Arnold Oceng as Nathan
Natasha Sparkes as Gemma
Tom Waldron as Gemma's Dad

Critical reception
The film was panned upon release and holds a score of 3.2 on IMDb.

References

External links

2011 films
British horror films
2011 horror films
Found footage films
2010s English-language films
2010s British films